The 1971 U.S. Pro Tennis Championships was a men's tennis tournament played on outdoor hard courts at the Longwood Cricket Club in Chestnut Hill, Massachusetts in the United States and was part of the 1971 World Championship Tennis circuit. It was the 44th edition of the tournament and was held from August 2 through August 8, 1971. Sixth-seeded Ken Rosewall won the singles title, his third U.S. Pro title, and the accompanying $10,000 first-prize money.  The final was watched by 5,500 spectators.

Finals

Singles

 Ken Rosewall defeated  Cliff Drysdale 6–4, 6–3, 6–0

Doubles

 Roy Emerson /  Rod Laver defeated  Tom Okker /  Marty Riessen 6–4, 6–4

Notes

References

External links
 International Tennis Federation (ITF) – tournament details
 Longwood Cricket Club – list of U.S. Pro Champions

U.S. Pro Tennis Championships
U.S. Pro Championships
U.S. Pro Championships
U.S. Pro Tennis Championships
U.S. Pro Tennis Championships
Chestnut Hill, Massachusetts
History of Middlesex County, Massachusetts
Sports in Middlesex County, Massachusetts
Tennis tournaments in Massachusetts
Tourist attractions in Middlesex County, Massachusetts